Metrosexual is a term for a trend among heterosexual men.

Metrosexual may also refer to:
Metrosexual (film), Thai-made in 2006

See also:
 Metrosexuality (TV series), a television series